Angelo il custode (Italian: The Guardian Angel) is a 2001 Italian comedy television series directed by  Gianfrancesco Lazotti and starring Lino Banfi as Angelo De Vita, an Italian in Argentina who must return home to prove to the Italian bureaucracy that he is still alive.

Cast

Lino Banfi: Angelo De Vita
Giovanna Ralli: Elisa Anselmi
Edoardo Costa: Adriano Anselmi
Francesca Rettondini: Simona
Gian Fabio Bosco: Giovannino
Federico Maria Galante: Ghigo
Cristiana Capotondi: Sara
Giuliano Gemma: Rocco
Rosanna Banfi: Tina

See also
List of Italian television series

External links
 

Italian television series
RAI original programming